Line 4 of Zhengzhou Metro is a rapid transit line in Zhengzhou. It opened on December 26, 2020.

Stations

References

Zhengzhou Metro lines
Line 4, Zhengzhou Metro
Railway lines opened in 2020
2020 establishments in China